Phnom Prich Wildlife Sanctuary is a  large protected area in eastern Cambodia that was established in 1993. It is part of maybe the largest protected area complex in southeast Asia.  Phnom Prich Wildlife Sanctuary borders Mondulkiri Protected Forest to the north and Keo Seima Wildlife Sanctuary to the south.

References

External 
 Mondulkiri's Wildlife Harmony - article in Cambodian Scene Magazine
 Mondulkiri Protected Forest and Phnom Prich Wildlife Sanctuary by IAPAD
 Map of Protected areas system in Cambodia

Geography of Mondulkiri province
Wildlife sanctuaries of Cambodia
Protected areas of Cambodia
Protected areas established in 1993